Marlanahalli  is a village in the southern state of Karnataka, India. It is located in the Karatgi taluk of Koppal district in Karnataka.

Demographics
As of 2001 India census, Marlanahalli had a population of 5234 with 2628 males and 2606 females.

Sri Venkateshwara swamy, Saibaba temple complex, Anjaneya swamy temples are famous in Maralanahalli
Govt Primary School which is established in 1979. Tungabhadra canal which is in the middle of the village

See also
 Koppal
 Districts of Karnataka

References

External links
 https://web.archive.org/web/20190810051205/https://koppal.nic.in/

Villages in Koppal district